OBC is the oldest known collegiate secret society operating at the University of North Carolina at Asheville. Its existence has been documented as early as May 1938; however, there is no confirmed documentation of its founding or membership.

History 

In March 1865, previously-secret legislation to create an official Special and Secret Bureau of the War Department was enacted by the Confederate Congress, and the Battle of Asheville was waged that April on the grounds of Woolsey Dip, the area which would eventually become the present-day campus of the University of North Carolina at Asheville. A small group of Confederate reserves stationed in the city was victorious; remaining Union troops were forced to withdraw to Tennessee. After the unexpected victory, rumors of the Confederate soldiers' potential association with the new Bureau arose. However, in preparation for the evacuation of Richmond, Confederate Secretary of State Judah P. Benjamin burned nearly all official documents related to the formation of the Secret Service, and the rumors were never able to be confirmed or dispelled. In the following years, rumors turned to the existence of a secret society in Woolsey Dip, alleged to have been organized by the small band of Confederate soldiers.

The Buncombe County Junior College opened its doors on September 12, 1927, welcoming 86 men and women free of tuition. However, tuition became necessary to the school's continuation in 1929 with the advent of the Great Depression. That year also saw the passage of the first graduating class, known as the "29 of '29," and a merger with Asheville City College, after which it was known as Biltmore College. In 1934, the college changed location to College Street in downtown Asheville, and in 1936 it was chartered as Asheville-Biltmore College and accredited by the United States Department of Education. The school moved twice more over the next 15 years, first to Biltmore Avenue, south of downtown, then north of downtown to Merrimon Avenue. Finally, in 1948, the Alumni Association was founded under direction of United States House Representative Roy A. Taylor, the valedictorian of the class of '29, and the following year the college was moved to Seely's Castle on Sunset Mountain.

It was during the period of the college's residence at Seely's Castle that rumors of a secret society in Asheville arose once more. A small group of students whose possessions included artifacts from the American Civil War, referring to themselves as simply OBC, was alleged to use the lowest rooms of the castle to hold secret meetings, beginning a tradition of underground meeting places that is rumored to hold true to today. The original purpose of the group was believed to have been the creation of a public liberal arts college, as the society has been long associated with projects aimed at the improvement of what has now become the university.

Membership and associations 
Membership in the society has never been revealed. It has been written that members are students "deeply involved in student organizations and other prominent leadership positions in the University, a tactic which is suggested to ease the ability of the society to wield its influence within the University's community."

It has been suggested that the society is in communication with the administration and Board of Trustees of the University of North Carolina at Asheville, as well as the present-day owners of Seely's Castle. The society is also alleged to have associations with the North Carolina State government through Representative Taylor, beginning in 1948.

Name 
Since an account of the society's existence was first published in the late 1930s, "OBC" has been assumed to be an acronym; however, there has been no confirmation of either this or what the letters may stand for. Over the years, many names have been suggested, including "The Order of the Blue Castle," "The Order of Brothers Confederate," "Omega Beta Chi," "Olde Brethren of the Chamber" and, more recently, "The Organization on the Bulldog Campus."

Significance 

OBC is the oldest known secret society operating at the University of North Carolina at Asheville. Its historical significance lies not as heavily in its existence as a secret society, but as an academically-oriented society in favor of a liberal arts curriculum, as amongst North Carolina's many higher education institutions, UNCA is the only designated liberal arts institution in the UNC system.

Historically, the group is also suggested to have been responsible for keeping the college afloat during the long years of economic instability following the Depression, and for the construction of bomb shelters beneath many of the academic buildings during the Cold War. They are held to have begun the traditional autumnal ceremony of the Turning of the Maples, now hosted by the Alumni Office, in 1969 under the administration of Chancellor William E. Highsmith, to showcase the beauty of the campus.

Today, the society is accredited with a wide range of activities, from major financial donations to minor humorous pranks. The completed construction of the newest building on the University of North Carolina at Asheville campus, Zeis Hall, is reported to have been possible only thanks to the donation of a large sum of money from the society. The symbol believed to be linked to the society, a large letter B surrounded by a circle with two hash marks at 45 and 135 degrees, appears on buildings and sidewalks in out-of-the-way locations on campus approximately once every semester. Most recently, the group is publicly held to be the source of the nickname "Chan Anne" for current (2005- ) UNC Asheville Chancellor Anne Ponder.

References

External links
 http://www.unca.edu/alumni/history/timeline.html
 http://toto.lib.unca.edu/findingaids/photo/ball/pages/ball_n1030.html
 http://toto.lib.unca.edu/university_archives/institutional_history/history_1927_2001/UNCAhistory.html

University of North Carolina at Asheville